The Newbern Hotel is a historic hotel/apartment building in Kansas City, Missouri, United States, that is listed on the National Register of Historic Places (NRHP).

Description
The building consists of two basically rectangular nine story towers bridged by a one-story barrel vaulted hall giving the overall plan a U shape. One of the towers has a curved corner on the northeast, towards the intersection. Designed by Ernest O. Brostrom it displays Sullivaneque architectural style. Built from 1921 to 1923 by J.O. Jones of the Armour Building Company, the intended name was "Le Pavonien" but the initial name was the Peacock Hotel. It was renamed the Newbern Hotel in 1925 when Beine H. Hopkins bought the property. It was listed on the NRHP on September 23, 1980.

See also

 National Register of Historic Places listings in Jackson County, Missouri: Kansas City other
 Historic preservation

References

External links

 
 

1921 establishments in Missouri
Hotel buildings on the National Register of Historic Places in Missouri
Hotels established in 1921
Hotel buildings completed in 1921
Hotels in Kansas City, Missouri
National Register of Historic Places in Kansas City, Missouri